The Harrington Machine Shop is a historic industrial building located in the Franklintown area of Philadelphia.  It is located next to the former Middishade Clothing Factory. Built in 1903, it is a five-story building with a steel and wood frame, faced with brick and ashlar stone.  It measures 215 feet by 100 feet.  The company made hoists.

The Harrington Machine Shop was added to the National Register of Historic Places in 1983. The interior has been converted into loft apartments.

References

Industrial buildings and structures on the National Register of Historic Places in Philadelphia
Industrial buildings completed in 1903
1903 establishments in Pennsylvania